Saint Louis Assembly was a Chrysler automobile factory in Fenton, Missouri. The "South" plant opened in 1959, while the "North" portion opened in 1966. The Saint Louis Factory was built to accommodate Chrysler's new Chrysler B platform allowing the company to build subcompact vehicles. Saint Louis North was the home of minivan production from 1987 through 1995, when it was converted to build the Dodge Ram pickup truck.  Minivan production was switched to the South plant (shut down from 1991–95) in 1995 and continued there through the 2007 model year.

On 13 December 2005, DaimlerChrysler announced that it would spend US$1 billion upgrading the two Saint Louis plants to be more flexible and efficient. This process was expected to occur between 2006 and 2010. On 30 June 2008, Chrysler, LLC announced plans to shutter the South plant, consolidating all minivan manufacture in Windsor, Ontario, Canada.

Production at the North plant was shut down, along with other Chrysler factories, when the company filed for bankruptcy on 30 April 2009. Although production briefly resumed the last week of June 2009, the plant was later closed for good in early July 2009. Both plants were razed in 2011.

In 2013 the 300-acre site was floated as a possibility for the site for a new stadium for the St. Louis Rams if plans to renovate Edward Jones Dome did not materialize. The Rams ultimately chose to return to Southern California. The team formally filed its request to leave St. Louis for Los Angeles on 4 January 2016. On 12 January 2016, the NFL approved the Rams' request for relocation to Los Angeles for the 2016 NFL season.

In October 2016, groundbreaking began for the $222 million Fenton Logistics Park by KP Development. It will include two million square feet of office, warehouse, and industrial space.

Vehicles produced
Some of models produced at the North and South plants included:

1960–1966 Dodge Dart/Lancer/Plymouth Valiant
1964–1966 Plymouth Barracuda
1965–1976 Dodge Coronet/Plymouth Belvedere
1968–1974 Dodge Charger
1971-1980 Dodge Sportsman/Dodge Tradesman (North plant) 
1973–1976 Dodge Dart/Plymouth Valiant
1974-1980 Plymouth Voyager (North plant) 
1976–1977 Dodge Aspen/Plymouth Volare
1977–1981 Chrysler LeBaron/Dodge Diplomat
1978-1987 Plymouth Caravelle (Canadian M-body)
1981–1986 Dodge Aries/Plymouth Reliant (2-door sedans)
1982–1983 Dodge 400 (coupe/convertible)
1982–1986 Chrysler LeBaron
1984–mid 1987 Chrysler Fifth Avenue/Dodge Diplomat/Plymouth Gran Fury
1983–1986 Chrysler Executive
1983–1986 Dodge 600/Plymouth Caravelle (coupe/convertible)
1984–1986 Chrysler Laser/Dodge Daytona
1987–1991 Chrysler LeBaron (coupe and convertible)
1987–1991 Dodge Daytona
1987–2000 Plymouth Voyager
1987–2006 Dodge Caravan
1990–2008 Chrysler Town & Country
1995–2009 Dodge Ram
2000–2003 Chrysler Voyager

References

Chrysler factories
Former motor vehicle assembly plants
Motor vehicle assembly plants in Missouri
Buildings and structures in St. Louis County, Missouri
1959 establishments in Missouri
2009 disestablishments in Missouri
Buildings and structures demolished in 2011
Demolished buildings and structures in Missouri
Industrial buildings completed in 1959